The 2020–21 GNK Dinamo Zagreb season was the club's 110th season in existence and its 30th consecutive season in the top flight of Croatian football. In addition to the domestic league, Dinamo Zagreb participated in this season's editions of the Croatian Football Cup, the UEFA Champions League, and the UEFA Europa League. The season covered the period from 26 July 2020 to 30 June 2021.

First-team squad

New contracts

Transfers

In

Loan returnees

Out

Loan out

 Total Spending: €13,800,000

 Total Income: €30,450,000

 Net Income: €16,650,000

Pre-season and friendlies

Competitions

Overview

Prva HNL

League table

Results summary

Results by round

Matches 
The league fixtures were announced on 29 July 2020.

Croatian Football Cup

UEFA Champions League

UEFA Europa League

Qualifying rounds

Group stage

The group stage draw was held on 2 October 2020.

Knockout phase

Round of 32
The draw for the round of 32 was held on 14 December 2020.

Round of 16
The draw for the round of 16 was held on 26 February 2021. The order of legs was reversed after the original draw to avoid a scheduling conflict with the Arsenal v Olympiacos second leg in the same city on 18 March, as Arsenal were the domestic cup winners and given higher priority over Tottenham.

Quarter-finals
The draw for the quarter-finals was held on 19 March 2021.

Statistics

Goalscorers

References

External links

GNK Dinamo Zagreb seasons
Dinamo Zagreb
Dinamo Zagreb
2020–21 UEFA Europa League participants seasons
Croatian football championship-winning seasons